The Flamingo Stakes was an American Thoroughbred horse race for three-year-old horses run over a distance of a mile and one-eighth. Run as the Florida Derby until 1937, the inaugural event took place at Tampa Downs on February 27, 1926. There was no race in 1927 and 1928 but was revived in 1929 at Hialeah Park Race Track.

Historical race notes
In 1937, Court Scandal won the first edition of the renamed Flamingo Stakes for owner Townsend Martin, an investment banker, polo player, and former part owner of the New York Jets football team.

With the introduction of the grading system for races in 1973, the Flamingo Stakes was given Grade I status which it held through 1989. Run in March or early April, for many years it was a very important early prep race for the Kentucky Derby. Nine winners of this race went on to win the Derby: Lawrin (1938), Faultless (1947) Citation (1948), Needles (1956), Tim Tam (1958), Carry Back (1961), Northern Dancer (1964), Foolish Pleasure (1975), Seattle Slew (1977), Spectacular Bid (1979).

In 1948, Citation won the Flamingo Stakes under regular jockey Al Snider. Six days later Snider drowned while out fishing in the Florida Keys and Eddie Arcaro would replace him on Citation, going on to win the U.S. Triple Crown.

The Flamingo Stakes was run in two divisions in 1952.

Chief's Crown finished first in the 1985 Flamingo Stakes but was disqualified to second. A successful appeal was reported by The Washington Post as "Racing officials in Florida redressed an injustice yesterday and made Chief's Crown the official winner of the Flamingo Stakes."

Hialeah Park racetrack ran into financial problems and in 2001 the facility ceased racing operations. 
 Frank Stronach's Thunder Blitz won the final running of the Flamingo Stakes.

Records
Speed record:
 1:46.80 @ 1 1/8 miles : Honest Pleasure (1976)

Most wins by a jockey:
 4 – Eddie Arcaro (1942, 1944, 1955, 1957)
 4 – Jorge Velásquez (1967, 1978, 1986, 1988)
 4 – Jacinto Vásquez (1971, 1973, 1975, 1980)

Most wins by a trainer:
 4 – Ben A. Jones (1938, 1939, 1947, 1948)

Most wins by an owner:
 4 – Calumet Farm (1947, 1948, 1958, 1978)

Winners

Note: 
 1968 – Iron Ruler disqualified from first to second
 1962 – Sunrise County disqualified from first to third
 1958 – Jewel's Reward disqualified from first to second

References

Horse races in Florida
Graded stakes races in the United States
Discontinued horse races
Hialeah Park
Recurring sporting events established in 1926
Recurring sporting events disestablished in 2001
1926 establishments in Florida
2001 disestablishments in Florida